Ferhat Çoğalan (born 29 June 2002) is a professional footballer who plays as a midfielder for Pau B. Born in France, he is a youth international for Turkey.

Club career
Born in Grande-Synthe, France, Çoğalan's father, Sedat, was a footballer who played for Nancy in France, as well as Turanspor and Şanlıurfaspor in Turkey. Ferhat started playing football at the age of four, joining local side Olympique Grande-Synthe. At the age of eleven, he trialled with Spanish side Barcelona, but ultimately turned down their offer to sign him.

In August 2013, he moved to Spain to join the academy of Valencia, turning down numerous clubs across Europe in the process. He settled quickly in Valencia, picking up a man of the match award as his side won the LaLiga Promises Cup in late 2014. The following year he was linked with a move to Manchester United, with his father claiming that the English side had already held talks with the player.

He was offered a new contract with Valencia in 2018, but rejected the terms, instead opting to return to France to join Lille. His father later explained that they had decided to make the move after Valencia changed the infrastructure of their youth development projects, with Lille offering a clearer path to professional football. He signed a professional contract with Lille until June 2021.

However, three years after joining Lille, in which he only made four appearances for the club's B team, Çoğalan was released in July 2021.  Following his departure from Lille, he trialled with Turkish side Beşiktaş in February 2022.

After a year with no club, Çoğalan joined Ligue 2 side Pau in 2022, going on to play for their B team in the Championnat National 3.

International career
Çoğalan has represented Turkey from under-14 to under-17 level.

Career statistics

Club

Notes

References

2002 births
Living people
People from Grande-Synthe
French people of Turkish descent
French footballers
Turkish footballers
Turkey youth international footballers
Association football midfielders
Championnat National 2 players
Championnat National 3 players
Olympique Grande-Synthe players
Valencia CF players
Lille OSC players
Pau FC players
French expatriate footballers
Turkish expatriate footballers
French expatriate sportspeople in Spain
Turkish expatriate sportspeople in Spain
Expatriate footballers in Spain